Priya Kansara is a British actress. Her first two television acting credits are appearances in Bridgerton and The Bastard Son & The Devil Himself. In 2023 she appeared as the lead in the Nida Manzoor feature film Polite Society.

Career
Kansara worked office hours in healthcare communications for a pharmaceutical company but had wanted to be an actress since childhood. She attended three years of night classes at the Identity School of Acting in London until March 2021. Her first audition after leaving her job led her to appearing in season two of period drama Bridgerton for Netflix as Miss Eaton. Shortly afterwards she appeared in another Netflix series, The Bastard Son & The Devil Himself. In the summer of 2022 Kansara was named as one of Screen International’s “Stars of Tomorrow”. 

Kansara was given the lead role in the British action comedy film Polite Society from Nida Manzoor. Following the premiere of Polite Society at the Sundance Film Festival Peter Dubrage writing in Variety said that she was “a natural who, believe it or not, has never had a lead role till now” who in the role of the culturally straight-jacketed wannabe stunt woman “plays with deliciously exaggerated indignance”. Praise  also came from
Adrian Horton writing in The Guardian who described her as a “delightful newcomer”, and Chase Hutchinson for Collider who says Kansara “already in her relatively short career, has all the makings of a star. She can fully dive into the moments of silly slapstick just as she does the more nuanced emotional beats about trying to find your way in the world.” Manzoor jokingly referred to Kansara as “the next Tom Cruise… She did so many of her own stunts.”

Filmography

Film

References

Living people
English television actresses
English film actresses
21st-century English actresses
Year of birth missing (living people)